Rónán Ó Snodaigh (born 1 January 1970 in Dublin, Ireland) is a songwriter, composer, musician, poet and founding member and lead vocalist in the musical group Kíla. He has revolutionised the playing of the bodhrán and written many songs in Irish and English. He has written and released seven solo albums.

Amongst the many percussion instruments Ó Snodaigh plays are bodhrán, djembe, congas, and bongos. He also plays the guitar and to a lesser extent the harp.

He is the second youngest of six boys born to historian and publisher Pádraig Ó Snodaigh and sculptress Cliodhna Cussen. He's a brother of politician Aengus Ó Snodaigh and of course his bandmates Colm and Rossa Ó Snodaigh. He has 4 children and a step son and currently lives in Bray, Co. Wicklow.

Rónán has toured with Dead Can Dance and Lisa Gerard and composed music for nature documentaries Wild Journeys and The Eagles Return and played and recorded with a myriad of performers one of whom is the late Mic Christopher on his album Skylarking.

Early life and career

Rónán was born on the first of January 1970 and grew up as the 2nd youngest of 6 boys in an Irish speaking family in Sandymount, Dublin. He then went on to attend Coláiste Eoin where he got bodhrán lessons from an ex-pupil who was doing his H-dip. In third year he joined his younger brother Rossa's band as the bodhrán player. Around this time he began writing poetry and self published a variety of collections which he sold to his counterparts in school. Since his 20s he has produced three collections of lyrics and poems and since his 30s e has released 7 solo CDs. 
From the age of 16 he immersed himself into the "street music scene" that erupted in Dublin in the late 80s and early 90s and has been a central member of the band "Kíla" since they formed in 1987. He was in the Dead Can Dance line up for the "Toward the Within" Tour and toured with Lisa Gerard on her debut solo tour also. Rónán released his first solo album 'Tip Toe' with Simon O reily and a host of other musicians in 2001 and has gone on to record another 6 with his most recent being solo album in both English and Irish and has been involved in a wide variety of rhythm pageants, brightly coloured processions, dance shows and performances.

Singing Style
Rónán's singing style owes more to reggae toasting then to any form of traditional Irish singing. Initially his bodhrán playing and poetry writing were two separate expressions. He didn't have much confidence in his own voice since being asked  to leave the in primary school choir. But upon a visit to Camden market in London in the late eighties he saw these rastas toasting to backing music. The lyrics weren't being  sung but recited with conviction that was demanding of his attention. He then began the process of trying to blend his written work with his voice and bodhrán playing. His first song Cathain which was recorded by Kíla on their first Album Handle's Fantasywas picked up by Liam Ó Maonlaí who sang it all over the world in his group The Hot House Flowers.

Bodhrán Techniques

Not being content with the range of rhythmic expression available by playing the bodhrán in the standard way he began experimenting and thus developed many new methods of playing the bodhrán which have been adopted by most bodhrán players since.

No Cross Sticks
First he took away the crossed sticks at the back of the bodhrán which were getting in the way of his moving his hand up and down the skin which was being used by bodhrán players to dampen the resonance and change the tone of the struck sound. The crossed sticks had the effect of stopping the bodhrán from falling away so this then necessitated lodging the bodhrán under the armpit and gripping the frame with the side of his elbow. This caused less of the skin to be available to play and also deadend the resonant tone was somewhat which he preferred.

Cipinís / Stricking Sticks
The standard cipín was the bone shaped one, that being two circular ended stick. He began experimenting with other types of cipíns or striking sticks early on. He has spent time playing wth heavier, lighter, longer cipíns to try to achieve various different effects.  In order to widen the sonic palette available to him he would play with two sticks in the one hand. He also tried various painting brushes and even tried hair brushes. Noticing that drum sticks had acorn shaped heads he reckoned he could gain more precision with these so started picking up broken drum sticks at gigs and cut them to various sizes to find the right fit. He also experimented broken fiddle bows and has worked with cipín makers to come up with the best design to suit him and has also carved many of his own cipíns as well.

Brush Bodhrán
As soon as the wire brushes were made available to drummers he was using one as a striker to add a soft shaker type rhythm to light jigs especially, he now uses the brush at the back of the skin to give a snare effect to his playing. He had previously moved his finger hold from the middle of the stick which produced a triplet in one forward back motion to a fingerhold further up the stick which meant the triplet could be controlled and added when even desired. This slight change also meant that he could do longer rolls and crescendos.

Slide Bodhrán
It was he who introduced the slide stick technique to bodhrán playing. His brother Rossa took one of his father's fax papers rollers and melted holes in it to try to make a whistle. But having failed left it on his mother's workshop table. It wasn't a failed whistle that Rónán saw but a bodhrán stick with finger grips which he grabbed with his left hand, pushed it against the back of the bodhrán whereupon he noticed that when he played the bodhrán above it the pitch dramatically changed with each small movement. He reckoned that this could enable him to play a melody on the bodhrán. This new technique caused an immediate buzz around the trad scene in Dublin and players began experimenting with all sorts of tubes. It was only after Melody Maker started selling clavé sticks for £1 a pair that these became the standard slide stick.

Bodhrán Bag
There were no bodhrán bags being made in the 80s. Touring players had hard heavy cases that were difficult to make and very expensive to make or purchase. During a panic to pack for an away trip Rónán noticed that the only bag in the house that his bodhrán would fit into was the luminous orange Irish Times paper-round bag. It was perfect, he could carry three of four bodhráns and shakers and clother in this bag. Bodhrán players across the city caught on to this idea and for a while it seemed like competing newspapers were sponsoring the countries bodhrán players.

The Back Stick / Two-stick style 
Noticing that drummers worldwide used a stick in both hand to play their drums, Rónán began experimenting with a stick in hi left hand. This would usually be a much heavier stick used as a metronomic beater on the back rim of the bodhrán thus gaining the wooden strike sound without interrupting the rhythmic pattern on the front skin.  He also uses it on the back skin to act as a bass drum beat.

Bodhrán as Hand-drum
While it's likely that Tommy Hayes and other bodhrán players were doing this, Rónán had never seen him do it and unrestrained by the traditional way of playing the bodhrán, would put the bodhrán between his knees and play it like a hand drum along to certain songs or tunes at sessions.

Skin Tautness and Skin Types
In the eighties it was joked that the best way to play a bodhrán was with a penknife. In this atmosphere Ronán was advised to dampen the bodhrán skin with porter by many older players. He did this once and found that it rendered the skin unplayable. Dampness is the curse of Bodhrán skins for those like Roánán who prefer a taut skin. So to counteract his own sweat being absorbed he's bring hair dryers to gigs to try to tighten the skin. He also experimented by covering the back of the skin with beeswax but this made the bodhrán sound like playing a cardboard table.  
Speaking to a sail maker he noted that their synthetic canvas sails did not absorb moisture so he experimented by covering a bodhrán frame with this material, the result was a very even tone but caused a type of zipping or whistling sound when the cipín struck the skin. Goat skin is the usual type of skin used on bodhráns but he has found that cow hide to be less inclined to absorb moisture. 
He also attempted to fashion a snare drum as a bodhrán by sawing off half of the metal encasing of the drum and removing the snare, the sound was extremely lively but essentially made an unholy racket.  
Rónán thought all his chrismasses had come at once when the WAV Drum was put on the market. Here was an electronic drum that had endless sound settings could be played like a bodhrán was sensitive to the power of the strike and the skin was sensitive to pressure meaning he could alter the depth of the note. Alas it broke and could not be fixed and the new model did not have the same settings as the first one and so this went by the wayside.

Tuneable Bodhrán
A Kerry-based artist in the early nineties had come up with a novel idea of using a bicycle tube as a mechanism to tune drums. By inflating or deflating the tube the drums could be tuned or detuned within seconds. This design never made it into bodhrán makers handbook because the Belfast maker Séamus Ó Kane had already broken the mold with his new design where an extra frame could be forced out onto the skin or retracted by adjusting nuts inside the frame. These new tuneable bodhráns were initially designed for muted playing at acoustic sessions; they had deep bodies, a ring of tape around the outer edge of the skin to dampen the resonance and were more expensive than a regular bodhrán.

They didn't suit Rónán's style of playing but luckily at a world music festival fair he came across a tuneable Pakistani frame drum that was similar in design to the tuneable tambourines with a metal ring around the exterior frame held by threaded hooks at the base of the frame and tension nuts to hold and to tune. This served Rónán for many years and he'd often be seen tuning this bodhrán with pliers between songs on stage. At a fraction of the cost of the new tuneable ones these Pakistani bodhráns never made it into any other bodhrán players hands, perhaps due to the smooth exterior of the Irish designed ones.

After the threads of his Pakistani bodhrán wore, Rónán was left without a decent tuneable stage bodhrán. An FB story went out and lo and behold a Rónán was sent a couple of tuneable fired clay bodhrán's made by a designer in Portugal who was using the bicycle tube method he had come across in the 1990s. Another bodhrán maker named Paraic McNeela sent him a couple of his tuneable bodhráns which are those he now plays onstage.

Tongue Bodhrán
In the early nineties he gave his friend, musician and artist Toby Borland an idea he had of making a tongue drum in the shape of a bodhrán. Toby used some layered ply to fit his creation to the bodhrán frame. The open back and the choice of wood did not lend itself to a resonant sound. Another bodhrán player, Brian Flemming, brought this idea further and gave the idea to instrument maker "?" who mass-produced a smaller sized circular tongue drum with a hard plastic hollowed back.

Bodhrán Harness
Most bodhrán players in the 80s sat down and rested the bodhrán on their left thigh but sitting down while busking was not an option nor was it an option onstage when the rest of the band were standing. He therefore developed a type of pelican stance, where while standing he rested his right foot on his left knee thus allowing him to play by pushing the bodhrán against his right knee. But his standing leg often got too tired and so he sought a new solution. He noticed that most marching musicians and drummers all had a harness and so the experimentation began to find the best solution. He attached  guitar strap to the upper and lower edges of the frame and attached another strap to that which formed an 8 shape and this has freed up his left elbow from gripping the frame meaning he can now use all his techniques whilst dancing around the stage.

Albums
1.Tip Toe, - released 2001.
2.Tonnta Ró,-  released 2004.
3.The Playdays, - released 2005.
4.The Last Mile Home, -  released 2007.
5.Water of a Ducks Back, - released 2010.
6.Sos, -  released 2013.  
7. Ór agus Airgead, released 2017 
8.Tá Go Maith, - released 2021.

Books
Luascadán - 2003, Published by Coiscéim.
Songs - 2004, Published by Kíla.
The Garden Wars - 2007 Published by Small World Media, Ireland.

External links

Biographical details on Kíla's website

1970 births
Living people
21st-century Irish male singers
Bodhrán players
Irish-language poets
Irish male singer-songwriters
Musicians from County Dublin

ga:Kíla